Circle is a town in and the county seat of McCone County, Montana, United States. The population was 591 at the 2020 census.

The community was so named because a rancher there branded his cattle with the image of a circle.

Geography
Circle is located at  (47.416987, -105.588734). Montana Highway 200 passes through town.

Climate
According to the Köppen Climate Classification system, Circle has a semi-arid climate, abbreviated "BSk" on climate maps.

Demographics

2010 census
As of the census of 2010, there were 615 people, 278 households, and 159 families living in the town. The racial makeup of the town was 97.7% White, 0.2% African American, 0.2% Native American, 0.3% Asian, and 1.6% from two or more races. Hispanic or Latino of any race were 1.6% of the population.

There were 278 households, of which 25.9% had children under the age of 18 living with them, 50.0% were married couples living together, 5.4% had a female householder with no husband present, 1.8% had a male householder with no wife present, and 42.8% were non-families. 39.2% of all households were made up of individuals, and 21.9% had someone living alone who was 65 years of age or older. The average household size was 2.14 and the average family size was 2.88.

The median age in the town was 45.9 years. 23.3% of residents were under the age of 18; 6.3% were between the ages of 18 and 24; 18.9% were from 25 to 44; 25.6% were from 45 to 64; and 26% were 65 years of age or older. The gender makeup of the town was 46.8% male and 53.2% female.

2000 census
As of the census of 2000, there were 644 people, 291 households, and 185 families living in the town.  The population density was 815.1 people per square mile (314.7/km2). There were 384 housing units at an average density of 486.0 per square mile (187.7/km2). The racial makeup of the town was 96.89% White, 0.78% African American, 0.93% Native American, and 1.40% from two or more races. Hispanic or Latino of any race were 1.09% of the population.

There were 291 households, out of which 27.8% had children under the age of 18 living with them, 56.0% were married couples living together, 5.5% had a female householder with no husband present, and 36.1% were non-families. 34.4% of all households were made up of individuals, and 19.6% had someone living alone who was 65 years of age or older. The average household size was 2.21 and the average family size was 2.84.

In the town, the population was spread out, with 23.9% under the age of 18, 6.5% from 18 to 24, 24.2% from 25 to 44, 23.6% from 45 to 64, and 21.7% who were 65 years of age or older. The median age was 42 years. For every 100 females there were 87.8 males. For every 100 females age 18 and over, there were 90.7 males.

The median income for a household in the town was $27,500, and the median income for a family was $36,354. Males had a median income of $28,125 versus $12,917 for females. The per capita income for the town was $13,412. About 16.2% of families and 18.3% of the population were below the poverty line, including 17.9% of those under age 18 and 15.3% of those age 65 or over.

Infrastructure
Circle Town County Airport is a public use airport located 1 mile east of town.

Education
Circle Public Schools educates students from kindergarten through 12th grade. The team name for Circle High School is the Wildcats.

George McCone Memorial County Library provides service to the area.

References

External links
 Circle

Towns in McCone County, Montana
County seats in Montana